Trøndelag District Court is a district court located in Trøndelag county, Norway. This court is based at four different courthouses which are located in Brekstad, Namsos, Steinkjer, and Trondheim. The court serves the entire county which includes 38 municipalities: Flatanger, Frosta, Frøya, Grong, Heim, Hitra, Holtålen, Høylandet, Inderøy, Indre Fosen, Leka, Levanger, Lierne, Malvik, Melhus, Meråker, Midtre Gauldal, Namsos, Namsskogan, Nærøysund, Oppdal, Orkland, Osen, Overhalla, Rennebu, Rindal, Røros, Røyrvik, Selbu, Skaun, Snåsa, Steinkjer, Stjørdal, Trondheim, Tydal, Verdal, Ørland, and Åfjord. The court is subordinate to the Frostating Court of Appeal.

The court is led by a chief judge and several other judges. The court is a court of first instance. Its judicial duties are mainly to settle criminal cases and to resolve civil litigation as well as bankruptcy. The administration and registration tasks of the court include death registration, issuing certain certificates, performing duties of a notary public, and officiating civil wedding ceremonies. Cases from this court are heard by a combination of professional judges and lay judges.

History
This court was established on 12 April 2021 after the old Fosen District Court, Inntrøndelag District Court, Namdal District Court, and Sør-Trøndelag District Court were all merged into one court. The new district court system continues to use the courthouses from the predecessor courts.

References

District courts of Norway
2021 establishments in Norway
Organisations based in Trondheim
Organisations based in Namsos
Organisations based in Steinkjer